The 63rd Regiment Indiana Infantry was an infantry regiment that served in the Union Army during the American Civil War.

Service
The 63rd Indiana Infantry was organized at Lafayette, Indiana, beginning February 21, 1862, as a battalion of four companies: A, B, C, and D. The remainder of the regiment was organized later in 1862 in Indianapolis.

The regiment was attached to Piatt's Brigade, Sturgis' Command, Defenses of Washington, to August 1862. Piatt's Brigade, Army of the Potomac, to October 1862. Railroad Guard, District of Western Kentucky, Department of the Ohio, to June 1863. Unattached, 2nd Division, XXIII Corps, Department of the Ohio, to August 1863. New Haven, Kentucky, 1st Division, XXIII Corps, to October 1863. District South Central Kentucky, 1st Division, XXIII Army Corps, to January 1864. District Southwest Kentucky, 1st Division, XXIII Corps, to April 1864. 2nd Brigade, 3rd Division, XXIII Corps, to August 1864. 3rd Brigade, 3rd Division, XXIII Corps, Army of the Ohio, to February 1865 and Department of North Carolina to June 1865.

Companies A, B, C, and D mustered out May 3, 1865. The remainder of the regiment mustered out of service on June 21, 1865.

Detailed service

Duty as prison guard at Lafayette and at Camp Morton, Indianapolis, Indiana, until May. Left Indiana for Washington, D.C., May 27. Duty in the defenses of Washington, D.C., until August 1862. Pope's Campaign in northern Virginia August 16-September 2. Ordered to Indianapolis, October 3. Completed organization of the regiment and prison guard at Camp Morton and Indianapolis until December 25, 1862. Ordered to Shepherdsville, Kentucky, December 25, and guard duty along Louisville & Nashville Railroad until January 16, 1864. Operations against Morgan July 2, 1863. Cummings Ferry July 8. At Camp Nelson, Kentucky, January 16 to February 25, 1864. March over mountains to Knoxville, Tennessee, February 25-March 15; then moved to Mossy Creek and to Bull's Gap April 1. Expedition toward Jonesboro and destruction of Tennessee & Virginia Railroad April 23–28. Atlanta Campaign May 1 to September 8. Demonstrations on Rocky Faced Ridge and Dalton May 8–13. Battle of Resaca May 14–15. Cartersville May 20. Operations on line of Pumpkin Vine Creek and battles about Dallas, New Hope Church, and Allatoona Hills May 25-June 5. Operations about Marietta and against Kennesaw Mountain June 10-July 2. Lost Mountain June 15–17. Muddy Creek June 17. Noyes Creek June 19. Cheyney's Farm June 22. Olley's Farm June 26–27. Assault on Kennesaw June 27. Nickajack Creek July 2–5. Ruff's Mills July 3–4. Chattahoochie River July 5–17. Isham's Ford July 8. Siege of Atlanta July 22-August 25. Utoy Creek August 5–7. Flank movement on Jonesboro August 25–30. Battle of Jonesboro August 31-September 1. Lovejoy's Station September 2–6. Pursuit of Hood into Alabama October 3–26. Nashville Campaign November–December. Columbia, Duck River, November 24–27. Columbia Ford November 29. Battle of Franklin November 30. Battle of Nashville December 15–16. Pursuit of Hood to the Tennessee River December 17–28. At Clifton, Tennessee, until January 16, 1865. Movement to Washington, D.C., then to Fort Fisher, North Carolina, January 16-February 9. Operations against Hoke February 12–14. Fort Anderson February 18–19. Town Creek February 19–20. Capture of Wilmington February 22. Carolinas Campaign March 1-April 26. Advance on Goldsboro March 6–21. Occupation of Goldsboro March 24. Gulley's March 31. Advance on Raleigh April 10–14. Occupation of Raleigh April 14. Bennett's House April 26. Surrender of Johnston and his army. At Raleigh until May 5. At Greensboro until June 21.

Casualties
The regiment lost a total of 188 men during service; 3 officers and 53 enlisted men killed or mortally wounded, 2 officers and 130 enlisted men died of disease.

Commanders

 Colonel and brevet Brigadier General Israel Newton Stiles
 Lieutenant Colonel Daniel Morris - commanded at the Battle of Franklin, Battle of Nashville, and during the Carolinas Campaign
 Major Frank Wilcox - commanded during the Carolinas Campaign

See also

 List of Indiana Civil War regiments
 Indiana in the Civil War

References

 Dyer, Frederick H. A Compendium of the War of the Rebellion (Des Moines, IA: Dyer Pub. Co.), 1908.
Attribution
 

Military units and formations established in 1862
Military units and formations disestablished in 1865
Units and formations of the Union Army from Indiana
1862 establishments in Indiana